Bath Rugby is a professional rugby union club in Bath, Somerset, England. They play in Premiership Rugby, England's top division of rugby.

Founded in 1865 as Bath Football Club, since 1894 the club has played at the Recreation Ground in the city centre.
The club has won 18 major trophies and was particularly successful between 1984 and 1998 when it won 10 Domestic Cups, 6 League titles and were the first English side to win the European Cup in 1998.  In 2008 they also won the European Challenge Cup, the continent's second tier of competition. Bath is one of only three clubs never to have been relegated from the top division of English rugby.

For the 2022–23 Premiership Rugby season, Bath will also compete in the 2022–23 European Rugby Challenge Cup.

The current Head of Rugby is Johann van Graan, having started in role ahead of the 2022-23 pre-season in July 2022.

History

Amateur era
Bath Football Club is one of the oldest clubs in existence, having been founded in 1865 by members of Lansdown Cricket Club in Bath (founded 1825) for 'something to do in the winter'. This is the reason why the club colours of the two clubs are identical. With an original home base at North Parade, Bath then led a nomadic existence during the 1800s playing at Claverton Down, Lambridge Meadows, Taylor's Field and Henrietta Park. They then leased a plot of land at Pulteney Meadow, where today's Rec stands. With most games played against local opposition: Weston-super-Mare, Gloucester, Clifton and the "Arabs" from Bristol. By the 1890s, Welsh clubs were starting to become regular opponents, with Cardiff and Penarth regularly appearing in the fixture list. With a traditionally lightweight pack, they would suffer regular defeats. The club played its first fixture against overseas opposition in 1907, as Racing Club de Bordelais crossed the Channel to play at the Rec. 1954 saw a first overseas tour by Bath, who beat the French teams St Claude (23–3). Givors (9–6) and Tour du Pin (17–0).

The trip was repeated the following year with wins against St Claude (13–8), Dijon (14–0) and Macon (8–3) as captain Peter Sibley was the first to develop the ethos for fast, attacking rugby in the Sixties.

With six-foot four-inch players such as England international back row David Gay, Peter Heindorff, Sibley had players with physique to impose this style of play. With the mercurial John Horton and the incisive Mike Beese, the side continued to develop Bath's reputation in the early Seventies with wins over the top Welsh sides. However, the revolution began with the arrival of coach Jack Rowell in 1978. Rowell transformed the ethos of a club that had traditionally drawn its players from the immediate locality. When formalised competitions started in the 1980s Jack Rowell brought premature professionalism to Bath and began to assemble a side with power and precision. The power, provided by Gareth Chilcott and Roger Spurrell was complemented by the precision of John Horton and winger David Trick.

By 1984, the first of ten knock-out cup successes had been achieved, at the expense of Bristol. Bath dominated the John Player Cup winning it four years on a trot, from 1984 to 1987. The cup sponsor changed to Pilkington, and Bath after a blip in 1988 dominated that cup as well winning it a further six times.

The formal league structure started in 1987 and Bath dominated the early years of the competition winning six times in eight years and doing the "double" four times. Bath were an unstoppable force in 1988–89 and ran away with the league title, winning the first ten of their eleven league matches. Their only defeat was at Leicester in the last game of the season, when Bath, with the title already won, rested several key players. The two sides met again a week later in the Pilkington Cup final at Twickenham which Bath won 10–6 to become the first English club to wrap up the double of winning both League and Cup.

1990 saw the last of six consecutive Twickenham final wins, defeating Gloucester 48–6.

1993–94 saw a unique "Grand Slam" of titles. In addition to the league (played on a home and away basis for the first time), the team won the Pilkington Cup (beating Leicester, with tries from Tony Swift and a youthful Mike Catt), the Middlesex Sevens (beating Orrell in the Final) and the Worthington Tens. Arguably the most "professional" amateur club side in English history, Bath has struggled to match the achievements of the Eighties and early Nineties.

In May 1996, Bath Rugby and Wigan RLFC made history by playing against each other at both codes. The first match was at Maine Road, Manchester under League rules and saw Bath struggle, eventually losing 82-6. In the return fixture under Union rules at Twickenham, Bath were able to regain a measure of pride by beating Wigan 44-19.

Professional era

Jack Rowell's departure (to take control of the England team) in 1995 and rugby union becoming a professional sport in 1996 has seen Bath struggle to find consistency either on or off the field. With regular changes in the coaching staff (including Andy Robinson's appointment as England's head coach) and with a seemingly steady turnaround of players, the formula that led to past successes is still being sought. However, Bath captained by Andy Nicol still managed to be the first British club to lift the Heineken Cup, in the 1997–1998 season. Bath beat French club Brive 19–18 in an exciting final in Bordeaux with Jon Callard scoring all the points for Bath.

Despite European glory, Bath slumped to sixth in the league the next season. In the disastrous league campaign of 2002–03, relegation was avoided by only a single point on the last day.

Having narrowly avoided relegation and merger with bitter rivals Bristol in the 2002–03 season, the club invested heavily in its squad, with no fewer than 15 changes in personnel during the summer of 2003. Jack Rowell and Michael Foley recruited wisely and the appointment of John Connolly as head coach helped gel the players into a formidable unit and the team ended the regular season at the top of the table six points clear of Wasps, but lost in the play-off final match at Twickenham.

Bath finished 4th at the end of the 2004–05 season. The club reached the Powergen Cup final after a dramatic extra-time try by Andy Williams in the semi-final against Gloucester, but lost to Leeds at Twickenham after a poor display. The pack continued to dominate but, with a backline once again decimated by injuries, many bemoaned the 10-man rugby displayed by Bath. Two players, Matt Stevens and Danny Grewcock, were selected for the Lions tour to New Zealand.

By the end of the 2004–05 season, Coach John Connolly had announced his intention to return to his native Australia, having created one of the most dominant packs in club rugby. The appointment of ex-England National Academy Manager Brian Ashton as the new head coach was announced in November 2005, and marked the return of the popular coach, who helped lead Bath to six league titles and six cup titles between 1989 and 1996. In May 2006, rumours of Ashton's return to the England coaching setup were rife. These rumours were confirmed on 25 May 2006, when Bath agreed to release Ashton from his contract for an undisclosed compensatory figure, to return to the RFU fold as attack coach for the England team.

Well known Bath players from the recent history of the club include Jeremy Guscott; Dan Lyle, one of the first Americans to play regularly in Britain; England captain Phil de Glanville; and Andy Robinson, an assistant coach of the Rugby World Cup – winning England side, who went on to be the England team's head coach and head coach of Scotland.

Throughout the 2004–05 and 2005–06 seasons, Bath Rugby played in the Heineken Cup – a European cup tournament. In 2006 they controversially defeated Leicester Tigers in the quarter finals at a sold out Walkers' Stadium in Leicester, being reduced to 13 men for the last ten minutes of the match for continual infringements at the scrummage. Bath then went on to lose the semi-finals against Biarritz. As they finished 9th in the league that year, Bath were ineligible for the 2006–07 HC competition, instead contesting the European Challenge Cup.

Bath were forced to find a new coaching team in the summer of 2006 after head coach Brian Ashton joined the England national team, forwards coach Michael Foley returned to Australia and skills coach Richard Graham joined Saracens. Backs coach, Steve Meehan, was appointed the new acting head coach. His appointment was later made permanent.

In 2008 Bath won their first silverware in 10 years, beating Worcester to win the European Challenge Cup. After defeat in the 2003 and 2007 finals, it was third time lucky for the English team who ground out an impressive win over Worcester Warriors at Kingsholm. Outgoing skipper Steve Borthwick led by example and was a tower of strength in the lineout on his way to becoming FedEx Man of the match. Borthwick, who went on to join Saracens the following season, was carried aloft by his jubilant teammates after a titanic tussle in appalling conditions. Worcester won the toss and opted to play with the wind at their backs in the first period. It mattered not as Bath dominated possession and territory in the first quarter, and deservedly took the lead on 15 minutes with an Olly Barkley penalty. Barkley went on to score a second penalty a drop goal and a conversion, but it was tries from Jonny Fa'amatuainu and Nick Abendanon that put the game beyond the reach of brave Worcester. Bath won 24–16.

On 14 April 2010, Bath Rugby announced a change of ownership and set out new plans for the future of the club, including a proposal to create a new club headquarters at Farleigh House and a commitment to build a new 20,000–25,000-seat stadium.

In 2011 the new owners brought in Gary Gold as head coach to replace the short-lived Ian McGeechan, who had briefly replaced Meehan. After a poor first season Gold was promoted to a director of rugby while defence coach Mike Ford became head coach. In December 2013 Gold left the club under unclear circumstances.

After a disappointing season seeing Bath finish 9th in the table, Mike Ford left the club at the end of the 2015–2016 season after an in depth review of the club was carried out, Neal Hatley joined Eddie Jones with the England team and Danny Grewcock left as Bath's Academy Director. On the 28 July 2016 Bath announced that Todd Blackadder would be taking over as director of rugby and Tabai Matson as head coach. This would see Blackadder reportedly signing a 3-year deal and Matson a 4-year deal.

On the 15 December 2021, Bath announced the appointment of Johann van Graan as their new Head of Rugby, following a wholesale review and restructuring of the coaching and conditioning teams.  Van Graan joined Bath from Irish provincial rugby club Munster on a long-term contract, with the aim of stabilising and rebuilding the club's fortunes following the disappointing 2021-22 season.

Budget

Supporters

The official supporters' club of Bath Rugby was formed in January 1997.

Stadium

 
Bath play at the Recreation Ground, also known as "The Rec".  The stadium is in the centre of the city, next to the River Avon. For the 2009–10 season the ground capacity was expanded to 11,700, and Bath play all of their home matches there during the club season. During summer, the ground is adjusted to make it capable for holding cricket matches. This cricket field is used for local contests and by Somerset County Cricket Club for one match a year.

Development of the Rec

In November 2009 the new chief executive, Nick Blofeld, stated the club is now seeking a mostly seated stadium for 20,000 to suit modern professional rugby, with potential for future expansion, containing "restaurants and cafés, hospitality suites, conference facilities and good food and beverage outlets and other potential retail outlets".

The issue of the charitable status of the Rec has prevented progress, but in 2013 the Charity Commission recommended a scheme to allow the club's former training ground at Lambridge to be exchanged for an extended footprint on the Rec free from the charitable rules. While a few appeals remain to be heard, the club is pushing on with designs for an 18,500-seat stadium, and intends to apply for planning permission in 2014.

The First Tier Tribunal decided to limit the land available to the club which has meant that pending leave to appeal the club's development plans have had to be put on ice. As a result, the club has put in a planning application to extend its capacity to 14,000 on a temporary basis for next two seasons to cover their 150th anniversary celebrations in 2015.

After being successful with recent planning applications, the club has been able to increase capacity by 1,000 for the 2016/17 season onwards – taking the capacity to 14,500 spectators for home games. The works took place during the 2016 off-season and saw the West Stand partially demolished and improved facilities provided, including bars, food outlets and toilets. The new consents will last for four years and will enable Bath to focus solely on resolution of a permanent redevelopment solution for the Rec, without on-going debate around temporary stands during this period. Permanent development proposals are intended to be brought forward long before the expiry of the four-year period.

Au updated decision in December 2016 from the Charity First-Tier Tribunal relating to a revised Scheme for the governance of the Bath Recreation Ground, including the use of the Recreation Ground site, was said by the club to "re-open the door to redevelopment at the Rec".

Twickenham Stadium
Since the 2016-17 season, Bath Rugby have played an annual home fixture at Twickenham Stadium. The fixture; dubbed The Clash is normally played around Easter and forms part of a five-year deal to host games at Twickenham. The 2017 match had an attendance of 61,868, and the 2018 match had 60,880 spectators.

Current kit
The kit is supplied by Macron. On the front of the shirt, Dyson is at the centre. Compeed appears on the left sleeve. On the back of the shirt, Thatchers is at the top with Avon Protection on top of the squad number and Grant UK at the bottom. On the back of the shorts, Dyson (who is also at the centre on the front of the shirt) is on the top while on the bottom, the Bendac Group is on the left and Your Red Car is on the right.

Season summaries

Gold background denotes championsSilver background denotes runners-upPink background denotes relegated

Club honours

Bath Rugby
English Premiership
Champions: (6) 1988–89, 1990–91, 1991–92, 1992–93, 1993–94, 1995–96
Runners–Up: (2) 2003–04, 2014–15
European Rugby Champions Cup
Champions: (1) 1997–98
European Challenge Cup
Champions: (1) 2007–08
Runners–Up: (3) 2002–03, 2006–07, 2013–14
Premiership Rugby Cup
Champions: (10) 1983–84, 1984–85, 1985–86, 1986–87, 1988–89, 1989–90, 1991–92, 1993–94, 1994–95, 1995–96
Runners–Up: (2) 2004–05, 2017–18
Somerset Senior Cup (tiers 4–7)
Champions: (6) 1970–71, 1971–72, 1973–74, 1974–75, 1975–76, 1982–83

Bath United
Premiership Rugby Shield
Champions: (1) 2013–14

Friendly
Middlesex Sevens
Champions: (1) 1994

Current squad

The Bath Rugby squad for the 2022–23 season is:

Club staff

Notable former players

Lions Tourists 
The following Bath players have been selected for the Lions tours while at the club:

 Frederick Belson (1899)
 Ron Rogers (1904)
 Jeremy Guscott (1989, 1993 & 1997)
 Gareth Chilcott (1989)
 Andy Robinson (1989)
 Stuart Barnes (1993)
 Ben Clarke (1993)
 Andy Reed (1993)
 Mark Regan (1997)
 Mike Catt (1997 & 2001)
 Nigel Redman (1997)
 Iain Balshaw (2001)
 Matt Perry (2001)
 Matt Stevens (2005) 
 Danny Grewcock (2005) 
 Lee Mears (2009)
 Taulupe Faletau (2017 & 2021)
 Jonathan Joseph (2017) 
 Anthony Watson (2017 & 2021)

Rugby World Cup
The following are players which have represented their countries at the Rugby World Cup, whilst playing for Bath, players in bold won the tournament:

Past club captains
Only includes players appointed club captain for the season. Individual game captains are not included.
2022–23  Ben Spencer
2019–22  Charlie Ewels
2017–19  Matt Garvey
2016–17  Guy Mercer
2011–16  Stuart Hooper
2010–11  Luke Watson
2009–10  Michael Claassens
2008–09  Michael Lipman and  Alex Crockett
2005–08  Steve Borthwick
2003–05  Jonathan Humphreys
2002–03  Danny Grewcock
2001–02  Dan Lyle

References

External links

 
 Official Supporters Website
 Come On My Lovers
 Bath's All Time Premiership Stats@Statbunker 
 Premiership Rugby Official Website

 
Premiership Rugby teams
English rugby union teams
Rugby clubs established in 1865
Sport in Bath, Somerset
1865 establishments in England
Heineken Cup champions
Rugby union in Somerset
2010 mergers and acquisitions